Beggars Night, or Beggars' Night, is a regional term for the practice of going "Trick or Treat" in the period before Halloween night. Beggars Night emerged to address security concerns over young children involved in unsupervised Trick-or-Treating. Instead, younger children were encouraged to Trick-or-Treat on another night, before Halloween. The chosen date for Beggars Night varies and is typically dependent on the day Halloween falls each year. Beggars Night typically begins after school and often concludes between 6 and 8 PM.

Regional celebrations
The practice is used in Ohio, Iowa, Nebraska, North Dakota, South Dakota, Kansas, Illinois, Indiana, Minnesota, Wisconsin, Western New York, and Western Pennsylvania.

Buffalo, New York
In the Buffalo area, Beggars Night falls on October 30 and is a scaled down version of Halloween.

Des Moines, Iowa 
In Des Moines Beggars Night falls on October 30th and children ring doorbells, say "Trick or Treat", then tell riddles or jokes such as, "What did the priest say when the church caught on fire?" "Holy smoke!" Due to high amounts of vandalism on Halloween night, the tradition began in 1938 as a way to move trick-or-treating children to a safer night.

Columbus, Ohio
In Columbus, Ohio, a 1954 police report claimed that Halloween festivities had gotten too rowdy, and the city discontinued Trick-or-Treating. As a result, the cities surrounding Columbus started celebrating the day before or the Thursday before Halloween. The Mid-Ohio Regional Planning Commission (MORPC) sets Beggars Night dates for the region. For both 2018 and 2019, Beggars Night takes place on October 31.

Washington, DC
In 1950s Washington, DC and its immediate suburbs, Beggars Night fell on October 30. On Halloween night (Oct. 31st), schools held student costume parties.

Vermont
In parts of 1970s Vermont, Beggars Night (October 30) was a night for playing tricks. Trick-or-Treat came on Halloween.

Seabrook, New Hampshire
In Seabrook, New Hampshire, Beggars Night is observed.

Houston, Texas
In 1993 residents of Candlelight Plaza, a small neighborhood north of the 610 Loop in Houston, Texas, decided to end Trick-or-Treat for kids who lived outside their neighborhood. They moved celebrations to October 30 and turned out lights on the 31st. The average age of the residents decreased over time, and more people began to go out on Halloween. However, the majority of residents (and adjacent neighborhoods of similar socioeconomic status) continue to celebrate Beggars Night. No person who enters is denied participation on the 30th, but some residents treat it as a private party whose details should only be shared with those personally known by the residents. Unlike other Beggars Night celebrations, this was not created or promoted by a municipality.

In popular culture
On the week of October 27, 2014, some of General Hospital'''s characters celebrated Beggars Night.''

See also
Mischief Night

References

Halloween practices
October observances